The triradiate cartilage (in Latin cartilago ypsiloformis) is the 'Y'-shaped epiphyseal plate between the ilium, ischium and pubis to form the acetabulum of the os coxae.

Human development

In children, the triradiate cartilage closes at an approximate bone age of 12 years for girls and 14 years for boys.

Clinical use

Evaluating the position of the triradiate cartilage on an AP radiograph of the pelvis with both Perkin's line and Hilgenreiner's line can help establish a diagnosis of developmental dysplasia of the hip.

References

See also

Pelvis